Robbert (Rop) Valentijn Gonggrijp (born 14 February 1968) is a Dutch hacker and one of the founders of XS4ALL.

Biography
Gonggrijp was born in Amsterdam. While growing up in Wormer in the Dutch Zaanstreek area, he became known as a teenage hacker and appeared as one of the main characters in Jan Jacobs's book Kraken en Computers (Hacking and computers, Veen uitgevers 1985) which describes the early hacker scene in the Netherlands. Moved to Amsterdam in 1988. Founded the hacker magazine Hack-Tic in 1989. He was believed to be a major security threat by authorities in the Netherlands and the United States. In the masthead of Hack-Tic, Gonggrijp described his role as hoofdverdachte ('prime suspect'). He was convinced that the Internet would radically alter society.

In 1993, a number of people surrounding Hack-Tic including Gonggrijp founded XS4ALL. It was the first ISP that offered access to the Internet for private individuals in the Netherlands. Gonggrijp sold the company to the former enemy Dutch-Telecom KPN in 1997. After he left XS4ALL, Gonggrijp founded ITSX, a computer security evaluation company, which was bought by Madison Gurkha in 2006. In 2001, Gonggrijp started work on the Cryptophone, a mobile telephone that can encrypt conversations.

Since 1989, Gonggrijp has been the main organizer of hacker events held every four years. Originally organized by the cast of Hack-Tic, these events have continued to live to this day.

Throughout the years, he has repeatedly shown his concerns about the increasing amount of information on individuals that government agencies and companies have access to. Rop held a controversial talk titled "We lost the war" at the Chaos Communication Congress 2005 in Berlin together with Frank Rieger.

In 2006 he founded the organisation "Wij vertrouwen stemcomputers niet" ("We do not trust voting computers") which campaigns against the use of electronic voting systems without a Voter Verified Paper Audit Trail and which showed in October 2006 on Dutch television how an electronic voting machine from manufacturer Nedap could easily be hacked. These findings were taken seriously both by the Dutch government and by international election observers.

On 16 May 2008 the Dutch government decided that elections would be held using paper ballots and red pencil only. A proposal to develop a new generation of voting computers was rejected.

Gonggrijp has worked for WikiLeaks, helping prepare the Collateral Murder April 2010 release of video footage from a Baghdad airstrike.

On 14 December 2010, in relation to ongoing investigations of WikiLeaks, the US Department of Justice issued a subpoena ordering Twitter to release information regarding Gonggrijp's account as well as those of Julian Assange, Chelsea Manning, Birgitta Jónsdóttir, Jacob Appelbaum and all 637,000 users following @wikileaks. The reason is Gonggrijp's assistance in enabling WikiLeaks to release the "Collateral Murder" video in April 2010, a WikiLeaks action.

References

External links
  Personal blog
  (Dutch and English)
  (Hack-Tic archive)
  History of XS4ALL (in Dutch)
  interview with Gonggrijp (in Dutch)
  Interview on Voting machines (in Dutch)
  Extensive Talk with Rop Gonggrijp about his life and the hacker communities in the Netherlands and Germany (in German)

1968 births
Living people
People from Amsterdam
Computer security specialists
Cypherpunks
WikiLeaks
Dutch magazine founders
Dutch company founders
20th-century Dutch businesspeople
21st-century Dutch businesspeople